The 2010 Judo Grand Prix Qingdao was held in Qingdao, China, from 17 to 18 December 2010.

Medal summary

Men's events

Women's events

Source Results

Medal table

References

External links
 

2010 IJF World Tour
2010 Judo Grand Prix
Judo
Judo competitions in China
Judo
Judo